The following is a list of Georgia State Panthers men's basketball head coaches. There have been 16 head coaches of the Panthers in their 60-season history.

Georgia State's current head coach is Jonas Hayes. He was hired as the Panthers' head coach in April 2022, replacing Rob Lanier, who left to become the head coach at SMU.

References

Georgia State

Georgia State Panthers men's basketball coaches